Oxia may refer to:

 the acute accent in polytonic Greek
 Oxeia, a Greek island
 a 1988 concept car by Peugeot
 Oxia Chaos, a chaos terrain on the planet Mars
 Oxia Colles, a mountain range on the planet Mars
 Oxia Palus quadrangle, one of the 30 quadrangles of the plant Mars
 Oxia Planum, a plain on the planet Mars